Eciton vagans is a species of New World army ant in the genus Eciton. It occurs in dry and wet forest habitats, occupying a range extending from Mexico to throughout Costa Rica and possibly Panama and Colombia. Raids are always in columns and are distinguished in being usually nocturnal; preferred prey commonly include other ants. It is closely related to the Eciton burchellii species.

References

External links
 

Dorylinae
Hymenoptera of South America
Insects described in 1792
Hymenoptera of North America